Rosickyite is a rare native element mineral that is a polymorph of sulfur. It crystallizes in the monoclinic crystal system and is a high temperature, high density polymorph. It occurs as soft, colorless to pale yellow crystals and efflorescences.

It was first described in 1930 for an occurrence in Havirna, near Letovice, Moravia, Czech Republic.  It was named for Vojtĕch Rosický (1880–1942), of Masaryk University, Brno.

Rosickyite occurs as in Death Valley within an evaporite layer produced by a microbial community. The otherwise unstable polymorph was produced and stabilized within a cyanobacteria dominated layer.

References

Native element minerals
Monoclinic minerals
Minerals in space group 13
Sulfur
Polymorphism (materials science)